Yenisey is a bandy club from Krasnoyarsk, Russia.  Yenisey has historically been a very successful club, having won the national championship sixteen times, last in 2021, and the Bandy World Cup in 1982, 1984, 2011 and 2015 and been runners-up in 1983, 1985 and 2000.

After the 2011/12 season, Sergey Lomanov Jr was named the best player of the national championship.

In 2017, former Mayor of Krasnoyarsk, Pyotr Pimashkov, became the new club president.

During the period when Yenisey Stadium was being rebuilt to become an indoor arena, Lokomotiv Stadium was the temporary home arena. In December 2018 the new indoor arena was opened.

Squad

Honours

Domestic
 Soviet/Russian Champions:
 Winners (16): 1980, 1981, 1982, 1983, 1984, 1985, 1986, 1987, 1988, 1989, 1991 / 2001, 2014, 2015, 2016, 2021
 Runners-up (5): 1990 / 1999, 2000, 2003, 2018
 Soviet/Russian Cup:
 Winners (4): 1984 / 1997, 1998, 1999
 Runners-up (9): 1985, 1990, 1992 / 2004, 2008, 2009, 2014, 2016, 2017

International
 World Cup:
 Winners (4): 1982, 1984, 2011, 2015
 Runners-up (5): 1983, 1985, 2000, 2012, 2017
 European Cup:
 Winners (7): 1980, 1983, 1986, 1987, 1988, 1989, 2001
 Runners-up (5): 1981, 1982, 1984, 1985, 1991

Yenisey-2
Yenisey's second team Yenisey-2 plays in the Russian Bandy Supreme League, the second tier of Russian bandy.

References

External links
Official club website (in Russian)
 Fans' website (in Russian)

 
Bandy clubs in Russia
Bandy clubs in the Soviet Union
Sport in Krasnoyarsk
Bandy clubs established in 1934
1934 establishments in Russia